was a Japanese samurai and waka poet of the early Kamakura period.

Family 
He married a daughter of Hōjō Tokimasa.

Poetry
He was a close friend of Fujiwara no Teika and his daughter married Teika's son Tameie. He is also said to have commissioned Teika's compilation of the Ogura Hyakunin Isshu.

He was the head of one of the chief poetic houses of the Kamakura period.

References

Bibliography
 
 
 

12th century in Japan
12th-century Japanese poets
13th century in Japan
13th-century Japanese poets
Samurai
People of Kamakura-period Japan